Lennie Leroy "Lenny" High was an American football end who played for one season for the Decatur Staleys of the National Football League. He played college football for Eastern Illinois University.

External links
Lenny High Bio (Staley Museum)

References

1895 births
1972 deaths
American football ends
Decatur Staleys players
Eastern Illinois Panthers football players
Players of American football from Illinois
People from Piatt County, Illinois